Panangad  is a village in Thrissur district in the state of Kerala, India.

Demographics
As of the 2001 India census, Panangad had a population of 14527 with 6866 males and 7661 females.

References

Villages in Thrissur district